Paul Rogers (born 10 February 1943) is Emeritus Professor of Peace Studies at the University of Bradford and Global Security Consultant with Oxford Research Group (ORG). He has worked in the field of international security, arms control and political violence for over 30 years. He lectures at universities and defence colleges in several countries and has written or edited 26 books, including Global Security and the War on Terror: Elite Power and the Illusion of Control (Routledge, 2008) and Why We're Losing the War on Terror (Polity, 2008). Since October 2001 he has written monthly Briefing Papers on international security and the "war on terror" for ORG. He is also a regular commentator on global security issues in both the national and international media, and is openDemocracy’s International Security Editor.

In the 1960s he worked with the Haslemere Group, an early pressure group on trade and development issues before embarking on an academic career first at Huddersfield and then at Bradford.

He holds a BSc and PhD from Imperial College London.

References

1943 births
Living people
Peace and conflict scholars
Academics of the University of Bradford
Alumni of Imperial College London
British non-fiction writers
British male writers
Male non-fiction writers